Ponte da Varela is a bridge in Aveiro District in Portugal. It was inaugurated on June 22, 1964, after a lengthy design phase. The bridge is constructed of concrete and steel, with the legs far enough apart to allow ships to pass beneath.

See also
List of bridges in Portugal

References

Bridges in Aveiro District